The 1982–83 New York Islanders season was the 11th season in the franchise's history. It involved winning their fourth consecutive Stanley Cup.

Offseason

NHL Draft

Regular season
 The 35th National Hockey League All-Star Game was played at Nassau Veterans Memorial Coliseum on February 8, 1983. The Campbell Conference defeated the Wales Conference 9-3. Denis Potvin, Bryan Trottier, Mike Bossy, and Dave Langevin all participated in the All-Star Game as representatives of the Wales Conference.

Season standings

Schedule and results

Pre-season

Regular season

Notable games
 November 30 vs. St. Louis: Billy Smith wins his 200th game as an Islander when Denis Potvin scores with 2:59 left.

Player statistics

Note: Pos = Position; GP = Games played; G = Goals; A = Assists; Pts = Points; +/- = plus/minus; PIM = Penalty minutes; PPG = Power-play goals; SHG = Short-handed goals; GWG = Game-winning goals
      MIN = Minutes played; W = Wins; L = Losses; T = Ties; GA = Goals-against; GAA = Goals-against average; SO = Shutouts;

Playoffs

Stanley Cup Finals
New York Islanders vs. Edmonton Oilers

New York wins the series 4–0.

Awards and Records
 Prince of Wales Trophy
 Conn Smythe Trophy: || Billy Smith
 Lady Byng Memorial Trophy: || Mike Bossy
 William M. Jennings Trophy: || Roland Melanson/Billy Smith
 Lester Patrick Trophy: || Bill Torrey
 Mike Bossy, Right Wing, NHL First All-Star Team
 Roland Melanson, Goaltender, NHL Second All-Star Team

References
 Islanders on Hockey Database

New York Islanders seasons
New York Islanders
New York Islanders
New York Islanders
New York Islanders
New York Islanders
Eastern Conference (NHL) championship seasons
National Hockey League All-Star Game hosts
Stanley Cup championship seasons